Flight of the Blue Jay is an album by Paul Motian, released on the German Winter & Winter label in 1997 and containing performances of bebop jazz standards by Motian with the Electric Bebop Band. The album is the group's third release following the 1992 album Paul Motian and the Electric Bebop Band and the 1995 album Reincarnation of a Love Bird. The band features saxophonists Chris Potter and Chris Cheek, guitarists Kurt Rosenwinkel and Brad Shepik, and bass guitarist Steve Swallow.

Reception
The AllMusic review by Scott Yanow stated that "overall, this date falls short of being memorable".

Track listing
 "Flight of the Blue Jay" (Paul Motian) - 3:05
 "Pannonica" (Thelonious Monk) - 4:31
 "Brad's Bag" (Kurt Rosenwinkel) - 5:48
 "Celia" (Bud Powell) - 5:04
 "The Blue Room" (Lorenz Hart, Richard Rodgers) - 2:49
 "Milestones" (Miles Davis) - 4:27
 "Light Blue" (Monk) - 3:02
 "Conception" (George Shearing) - 5:28
 "East Coast" (Rosenwinkel) - 5:33
 "Barbados" (Charlie Parker) - 3:07
 "Work" (Monk) - 6:07
Recorded at Avatar Studios in New York City on August 20 & 21, 1996

Personnel
Paul Motian - drums
Chris Potter - tenor saxophone
Chris Cheek - tenor saxophone
Brad Shepik - electric guitar
Kurt Rosenwinkel - electric guitar
Steve Swallow - electric bass

References 

1997 albums
Paul Motian albums
Winter & Winter Records albums